Below is a list of the tallest buildings in the U.S. state of Vermont by number of floors. All buildings over ten stories are included, as well as buildings over 100 feet in height. By the amount of floors, at 124 feet, Decker Towers in Burlington is the shortest building to be the tallest in a U.S. State.

Tallest buildings

Tallest proposed or approved

Other tall structures

References

Vermont
Tallest